The Mackenzie dike swarm, also called the Mackenzie dikes, forms a large igneous province in the western Canadian Shield of Canada. It is part of the larger Mackenzie Large Igneous Province and is one of more than three dozen dike swarms in various parts of the Canadian Shield. 

The mafic dikes cut Archean and Proterozoic rocks, including those in the Athabasca Basin in Saskatchewan, Thelon Basin in Nunavut and the Baker Lake Basin in the Northwest Territories.

The source for the Mackenzie dike swarm is considered to have been a mantle plume center called the Mackenzie hotspot. About 1,268 million years ago, the Slave craton was partly uplifted and intruded by the giant Mackenzie dike swarm. This was the last major event to affect the core of the Slave craton, although later on some younger mafic magmatism registered along its edges.

See also
Bear River dikes
Coppermine River Group

References

External links
Giant radiating dyke swarms: Characteristics and Origin of Giant Radiating Dyke Swarms

Dike swarms
Igneous petrology of the Northwest Territories
Igneous petrology of Nunavut
Igneous petrology of Ontario
Igneous petrology of Saskatchewan
Igneous petrology of Manitoba
Mesoproterozoic magmatism
Mackenzie Large Igneous Province